Norman is an unincorporated community in Glenn County, California.

History

A post office operated at Norman from 1870 to 1914, with a closure from 1889 to 1890.

Climate
According to the Köppen Climate Classification system, Norman has a warm-summer Mediterranean climate, abbreviated "Csa" on climate maps.

References

Unincorporated communities in California
Unincorporated communities in Glenn County, California